The Trofeo Villa de Gijón, called Trofeo Costa Verde until 1992, is a friendly association football tournament played annually since 1962 in Estadio Municipal El Molinón in Gijón, Asturias, Spain. The tournament is played between Spanish club Sporting Gijón and one or more invited teams.

The tournament was suspended in the following years:

1971: Suspended due to the works to change the pitch.
1981: Suspended due to the expansion of the stadium for the 1982 FIFA World Cup.
1987: The tournament was changed by a tribute to Quini.
1995: Suspended due to the financial crisis of Sporting Gijón.
2009 and 2010: Suspended due to the renovation of the stadium.
2017 and 2018: Suspended due to the works to change the pitch.

Results

List of winners

References

External links 
Trofeo Costa Verde at the RSSSF archives
Trofeo Villa de Gijón at the RSSSF archives

Spanish football friendly trophies
Sporting de Gijón
1962 establishments in Spain